Scott Fischer was a climber.

Scott Fischer may also refer to:

Scott Fischer (artist), American artist
Scott Fischer (producer)
Scott Fischer (comics), see List of DC Comics characters: S
Scott Fischer (gymnast), competed in 1999 Trampoline World Championships

See also
Scott Fisher (disambiguation)